Events in the year 2015 in the Comoros.

Incumbents 
 President: Ikililou Dhoinine

Events
 25 January – Legislative elections were held in the country alongside local elections. A second round of voting was held on 22 February in the 21 constituencies where no candidate won in the first round. The Union for the Development of the Comoros emerged as the largest party, winning eight of the 24 seats in the Assembly of the Union.

Deaths

See also 
 List of years in the Comoros

References

External links
 

 
2010s in the Comoros
Comoros
Comoros
Years of the 21st century in the Comoros